Teymurlu (also Romanized as Teymūrlū) is a city in Gugan District of Azarshahr County, East Azerbaijan province, Iran. At the 2006 census, its population was 5,221 in 1,460 households, when it was a village. The following census in 2011 counted 5,422 people in 1,713 households. The latest census in 2016 showed a population of 5,375 people in 1,796 households, by which time the village had been raised to the status of a city.

References 

Azarshahr County

Cities in East Azerbaijan Province

Populated places in East Azerbaijan Province

Populated places in Azarshahr County